Norman S. Waters (July 1, 1925 – February 25, 2012) served in the California legislature representing the 7th District. During World War II he served in the United States Army.

References

External links
 Norman S. (Norm) Waters Papers

United States Army personnel of World War II
1925 births
2012 deaths
Democratic Party members of the California State Assembly
University of California alumni
20th-century American politicians